"Blind in Love" is a song written by Bob Corbin, and recorded by American country music artist Mel Tillis.  It was released in September 1979 as the first single from the album Me and Pepper.  The song reached #6 on the Billboard Hot Country Singles & Tracks chart.

Chart performance

References

1979 singles
1979 songs
Mel Tillis songs
Song recordings produced by Jimmy Bowen
Elektra Records singles
Songs written by Bob Corbin (songwriter)